The Secular Coalition for America is an advocacy group located in Washington D.C. It describes itself as "representing the interests of atheists, humanists, freethinkers, agnostics, and other nontheistic Americans."

The Secular Coalition has chapters in all 50 states and Puerto Rico, composed of lobbyists trained by the organization. The Coalition holds an annual lobby day and policy conference, publishes yearly Congressional report cards and voter guides, and in 2013 issued its first Model Secular Policy Guide for Legislatures.

Coalition president Herb Silverman was a leading force behind the founding of the organization. Former White House staffer Edwina Rogers served as Executive Director from May 2012 to May 2014. Sean Faircloth, a five-term Maine state legislator, served as Executive Director between 2009 and 2011. Between 2005 and 2009, it was directed by former Nevada state senator Lori Lipman Brown, who became its first full-time lobbyist in September 2005.

The Secular Coalition works to increase visibility and respect for irreligious, nontheistic viewpoints in the United States and to protect and strengthen the secular character of the U.S. government. The Coalition advocates complete separation of church and state within American politics which they claim is clearly established in the U.S. Constitution under the First Amendment. Furthermore, the Coalition holds that freedom of conscience, which includes religious freedom, was of such importance that it was made the first of all freedoms protected in the Bill of Rights, and that reason and science should be guiding tenets for public policy.

Mission
The mission of the Secular Coalition for America is to increase the visibility of and respect for nontheistic viewpoints in the United States and strengthen the secular character of our government as the best guarantee of freedom for all.

History
The Secular Coalition for America was founded in 2002 by four U.S. secular organizations: Atheist Alliance International, the Institute for Humanist Studies, the Secular Student Alliance, and the Secular Web. In 2005 the American Humanist Association became the Coalition's fifth member organization. The Society for Humanistic Judaism and the Freedom From Religion Foundation joined the Coalition in January 2006, the Military Association of Atheists and Freethinkers in February 2007, and the American Ethical Union in April 2008. In 2009, Camp Quest joined in January and American Atheists became a member in June. The Council for Secular Humanism joined in January 2010.

Coalition president Herb Silverman was a leading force behind the founding of the organization, which was designed as a framework for cooperation among secular groups in the United States. Silverman believed that nontheistic Americans could gradually gain the respect of politicians and society if they collaborated on issues and presented a unified force for activism. Silverman had been raised Jewish but joined a Unitarian Church in adulthood.

The Coalition's member organizations, as of 2018, are:
 American Atheists
 American Ethical Union
 American Humanist Association
 Atheist Alliance of America
 Black Nonbelievers, Inc.
 Camp Quest
 Center for Inquiry (parent organization of the Council for Secular Humanism)
 Congress of Secular Jewish Organizations
 Ex-Muslims of North America
Foundation Beyond Belief
 Freedom From Religion Foundation
 Freethought Society
 Hispanic American Freethinkers
 Institute for Humanist Studies
 Military Association of Atheists and Freethinkers
 Recovering From Religion
 Secular Student Alliance
 Society for Humanistic Judaism
 The Clergy Project
 Unitarian Universalist Humanists

Board of directors
The Secular Coalition for America Board of Directors is democratically structured. Directors are nominated and voted on to serve by the member organizations. Officers may be associated with member organizations or may come from the wider freethought community. In August 2022, Steven Emmert became the Executive Director. Scott MacConomy is the Director of Policy and Government Affairs. Other current board members are Maggie Ardiente, president; Derek Araujo, vice president; Dana Morganroth, treasurer; Bryan Shelby, secretary; Herb Silverman, founder; Anthony Cruz Pantojas; Claudette St. Pierre; Rebecca Hale; and Lori Lipman Brown.

Advisory board
Advisors to the Secular Coalition for America are Woody Kaplan (Chair), Rob Boston, Richard Dawkins, Daniel Dennett, Rebecca Goldstein, Sam Harris, Jeff Hawkins, Wendy Kaminer, Michael Newdow, Dan Okrent, Steven Pinker, Salman Rushdie, Pete Stark, Todd Stiefel, and Julia Sweeney.

Legislative focus

The Secular Coalition for America addresses issues arising out of what they see as the inappropriate presence of religion into public policy, such as government funding of religious ministries (the "faith-based initiative" or "charitable choice"); tuition vouchers for religious schools; federally funded abstinence-only sex education; limits to embryonic stem cell research; constitutional marriage protection amendments; access to birth control and emergency contraception; the Religious Freedom Restoration Act, the Religious Land Use and Institutionalized Persons Act; and the Pledge Protection Act as well as other court-stripping measures.

The Coalition is particularly active in challenging what it perceives as discrimination against nontheists by government chartered organizations like the Boy Scouts of America.

Similarly, it works to keep military chaplains from actively sharing their beliefs with service members.
The Coalition also welcomes and works in cooperation with religious groups regardless of affiliation when the religious group(s) share their beliefs of freedom of conscience and separation of church and state. The Secular Coalition for America espouses religious tolerance to people of all religions and those without.

Elected official contest
In 2007 the Secular Coalition for America pledged a $1,000 reward to the person identifying the highest level elected official to openly acknowledge no supernatural beliefs. The "Find an Atheist, Humanist, Freethinker Elected Official Contest" concluded with the announcement that Rep. Pete Stark (D-Calif.), a member of the United States Congress since 1973, held the highest office of four public servants to acknowledge a secular world view to the Coalition after being nominated by a contestant. Stark was the first Congressional member to publicly self-identify with the freethought community.

Administration briefing
On February 26, 2010, the Secular Coalition for America, along with a unified delegation of members of the secular movement from across the country, met with representatives of the Obama administration for an official policy briefing—the first of its kind specifically for American non-theists. The group raised three particular areas of concern to secular Americans: military proselytizing and religious coercion, fixing the Faith-Based Initiatives program, and ending the exemptions granted to religious groups in laws governing child medical abuse and neglect.

Congressional scorecard
The Secular Coalition for America publishes an online Congressional scorecard rating U.S. Representatives and Senators on their roll call votes and legislative sponsorship.

References

External links
 

Church–state separation advocacy organizations
Separation of church and state in the United States
Separation of church and state
Secularist organizations
Secularism in the United States
Irreligion in the United States
501(c)(4) nonprofit organizations
Non-profit organizations based in Washington, D.C.
2002 establishments in the United States
Organizations established in 2002